The Liquidator is a 1965 British thriller film starring Rod Taylor as Brian "Boysie" Oakes, Trevor Howard, and Jill St. John. It was based on the first of a series of Boysie Oakes novels by John Gardner, The Liquidator. The film follows the 1964 novel closely. Due to a legal dispute, the film's original November 1965 release was delayed to the end of 1966, by which time the spy film craze was waning.

Plot
In 1944 during World War II, tank corps Sergeant "Boysie" Oakes (Rod Taylor) stumbles and unwittingly shoots and kills two men attempting to assassinate British Intelligence Major Mostyn (Trevor Howard) in Paris. Mostyn mistakenly believes Oakes was lethal on purpose.

Twenty-one years later, Mostyn (now a colonel in British Intelligence) and his boss (Wilfred Hyde-White) are in trouble due to a series of embarrassing security disasters. To save his job, the chief orders Mostyn to hire an assassin to illegally eliminate security leaks without official authorisation. Mostyn recruits Boysie into the Secret Service without first telling him what his employment will entail, luring him in with a lavish apartment and a fancy car. After Boysie passes a training course, Mostyn informs him that his code name is "L", and that it stands for liquidator. Unable to resign and not a killer himself, Boysie secretly hires a freelance professional assassin (Eric Sykes) to do the dirty work.

Things go well until Oakes persuades Mostyn's secretary Iris (Jill St. John) to spend the weekend with him on the Côte d'Azur, though Mostyn has warned him that any contact between spies and civilian employees is a serious criminal offence. Boysie is captured by enemy agents led by Sheriek (Akim Tamiroff), who firmly believes he is on assignment and wants to know who the target is. However, Sheriek's superior, Chekhov (John Le Mesurier), is coldly furious that he has gone beyond his orders to merely watch Boysie, thus endangering a much more important operation. He has Sheriek arrange for Boysie to escape.

Then Quadrant (David Tomlinson) arrives with a new mission for Boysie. He is to stage a fake assassination attempt on the Duke of Edinburgh, when he visits a Royal Air Force base, to test the security. Boysie finds that he has been duped: Quadrant is actually an enemy agent, and the bullets in his sniper rifle are real. Mostyn shows up in the duke's place and is able to locate Boysie, but while they are distracted, Quadrant and a pilot steal the real target: the Vulture, an advanced new  aircraft which the duke was to inspect. Boysie manages to shoot Quadrant and board the plane as it is taking off. To his surprise, the pilot is none other than Iris, who informs him that she is the coordinator of the operation. He is able to overpower her and, with radio help, return the aircraft to the base, dumping the aircraft into the grass by accident.

Cast

 Rod Taylor as "Boysie" Oakes
 Trevor Howard as Major/Colonel Mostyn
 Jill St. John as Iris
 Wilfrid Hyde-White as Chief (as Wilfrid Hyde White)
 David Tomlinson as Quadrant
 Akim Tamiroff as Sheriek
 Eric Sykes as Griffin
 Gabriella Licudi as Corale, Sheriek's girlfriend and the bait used to lure Boysie into Sheriek's hands
 John Le Mesurier as Chekhov
 Derek Nimmo as Fly, one of Mostyn's agents
 Jeremy Lloyd as Young Man
 Jennifer Jayne as Janice Benedict
 Heller Toren as Assistant
 Betty McDowall as Frances Anne, Boysie's first assigned victim
 Jo Rowbottom as Betty
 Colin Gordon as Vicar, Mostyn's agent on the Côte d'Azur
 Louise Dunn as Jessie
 Henri Cogan as Yakov, one of Sheriek's henchmen
 Daniel Emilfork as Gregory, the other Sheriek henchman
 Scott Finch as Operations Officer (as Scot Finch)
 Ronald Leigh-Hunt as Mac
 Richard Wattis as Flying Instructor
 David Langton as Station Commander
 Tony Wright as Flying Control
 Suzy Kendall as Judith, Mostyn's new secretary

Production
Producer Jon Pennington brought Australian screenwriter Peter Yeldham to the project after both had cooperated on The Comedy Man (1963). Yeldham recalled that Pennington acquired the novel, read it on an airplane and set the film into production in four or five months. Like the Jason Love Where the Spies Are, also filmed in MGM-British Studios, MGM planned a Boysie Oakes film series. Producer Sydney Box spoke to Yeldham and wished him to write two more scripts in the projected series.<ref>p.31 Taylor, Tadhg Peter Yeldham Interview in Masters of the Shoot-'Em-Up: Conversations with Directors, Actors and Writers of Vintage Action Movies and Television Shows' McFarland, 14 Oct. 2015</ref> 
  
Richard Harris was initially approached for the role but after negotiations chose to do The Heroes of Telemark instead. Taylor insisted on playing the role with an American accent because he was more comfortable with it by that stage in his career.

The film opens with animated titles by the Richard Williams studio.

Like Where the Spies Are, was also filmed in MGM-British Studios.  Cardiff recalled that the censors made them delete one of Taylor's lines: "it smells like a Turkish wrestler's jockstrap".

Reception

Release of the film was held up a number of months due to a legal conflict between producer Leslie Elliot and MGM. Jack Cardiff thought this hurt the final box office result of the film, which was disappointing.

Soundtrack

The original score was composed by Lalo Schifrin and includes a driving main title vocal theme and a soft end title theme ("My Liquidator"), both sung by Shirley Bassey. Other than the "Goldfinger"-type title song, Lalo Schifrin deliberately avoided the John Barry James Bond style of music.

DVDThe Liquidator'' was released to DVD by Warner Home Video on 6 September 2012 via the Warner Archive DVD-on-demand service.

References

External links

1965 films
1960s spy thriller films
1960s English-language films
British spy thriller films
Cold War spy films
Metro-Goldwyn-Mayer films
Films based on British novels
Films set in 1944
Films directed by Jack Cardiff
Films scored by Lalo Schifrin
Films set in Paris
Films set in Nice
Films set in London
Films set on the French Riviera
Films shot at MGM-British Studios
1960s British films